Sidney William Burgon (3 October 1936), better known as Sid Burgon, is a British comics artist. After working as a mechanic and drawing as a hobby he was encouraged by coworkers into furthering his artistic interests. He gave up his job in 1963 and became a freelance cartoonist with some of his early work being published The Weekly News under the pseudonym Swab. In 1970 Burgon began working for Fleetway drawing a number of strips including Bookworm for Whoopee!, Joker for Knockout and Ivor Lott and Tony Broke for Buster (comics). Burgon began to draw for DC Thomson in 1989 drawing a revival of Biffo the Bear in The Beano and Adrian the Barbarian for The Beezer (which was recently reprinted in The Beano as Olaff the Madlander). Burgon stopped drawing for DC Thomson in the late 1990s/early 2000s and is currently retired.

Bibliography

Fleetway
Bookworm
Handy Andy
Hit Kid
Ivor Lott and Tony Broke
Joker
Lolly Pop
Milly O'Naire & Penny Less
Roy's toys
School Funds
The Little Monsters for Monster Fun

DC Thomson
Adrian the Barbarian for The Beezer
Biffo the Bear for The Beano
Bully Beef and Chips for The Dandy
Keyhole Kate  for The Dandy                                                                
Euro School for The Dandy

References

Living people
1936 births
British comics artists
The Beano people
The Dandy people